X. australis  may refer to:
 Xanthorrhoea australis, the grass-tree or black boy, a plant species found in Australia
 Xenorma australis, a moth species in the genus Xenorma
 Xerula australis, a gilled mushroom species

See also
 Australis (disambiguation)